is a Japanese footballer who plays as a winger for 2. Bundesliga club Eintracht Braunschweig, on loan from Union Berlin. He also represents the Japan national team.

Club career
On 25 July 2020, Endo joined 1. FC Union Berlin on a season-long loan deal with the option to buy. He was expected to join Union Berlin on a permanent basis at the end of the 2020–21 season.

On 19 July 2022, Endo joined Eintracht Braunschweig on a season-long loan from Union Berlin.

International career
In May 2017, Endo was named in the Japan U20 national team's squad for the 2017 U-20 World Cup. In this tournament, he played three matches. On 29 December 2019, Endo was called up to the Japan U23 national team for the 2020 AFC U-23 Championship.

Career statistics

Club

International

Honours
Yokohama F. Marinos
 J1 League: 2019

Japan U19
 AFC U-19 Championship: 2016

References

External links
 
 
 Profile at Yokohama F. Marinos 
 

1997 births
Living people
Association football people from Kanagawa Prefecture
Japanese footballers
Association football wingers
Japan international footballers
Japan youth international footballers
J1 League players
Bundesliga players
2. Bundesliga players
Yokohama F. Marinos players
1. FC Union Berlin players
Eintracht Braunschweig players
Footballers at the 2018 Asian Games
Asian Games silver medalists for Japan
Asian Games medalists in football
Medalists at the 2018 Asian Games
Japanese expatriate footballers
Japanese expatriate sportspeople in Germany
Expatriate footballers in Germany